Gelingüllü Dam is a dam in Yozgat, Turkey. The development was backed by the Turkish State Hydraulic Works.

See also
List of dams and reservoirs in Turkey

References

DSI directory, State Hydraulic Works (Turkey), Retrieved December 16, 2009

Dams in Yozgat Province